Catalina Itatí Pérez Castaño (born 16 February 1989) is an Argentine footballer who plays as a defender for River Plate. She is a former member of the Argentina women's national team.

International career
Pérez represented Argentina at the 2004 South American U-19 Women's Championship. At senior level, she was part of the team at the 2007 FIFA Women's World Cup.

References

1989 births
Living people
Place of birth missing (living people)
Argentine women's footballers
Women's association football defenders
Club Atlético River Plate (women) players
Boca Juniors (women) footballers
Club Atlético Platense footballers
Argentina women's international footballers
2007 FIFA Women's World Cup players